Coopers Gap Wind Farm is a 453 megawatt wind farm in the Western Downs and South Burnett regions of Queensland, Australia. It is located approximately 175 km north-west of the state capital Brisbane, and 50 kilometres south-west of Kingaroy and 65 km north of Dalby. When construction was announced to be completed on 30 April 2020, it became the largest wind farm in Australia. This record was held until 10 December 2020 when the Stockyard Hill Wind Farm in Victoria was completed.

Site 
The wind farm is located in a hilly area, approximately 5 km to the north-west of the Bunya Mountains.

The site has an elevation of 535 to 840m. The project falls within both the South Burnett Regional Council and Western Downs Regional Council jurisdictions.

History 
The side was identified by Windlab using their proprietary WindScape wind mapping technology in late 2005, and a 60-metre wind-monitoring mast was installed in March 2006 in order to accurately measure wind speed and direction in the area. After twelve months of data capture, the proponents began securing land and pre-feasibility studies started.

In 2009, development approval was expected in the same year.

In April 2011, some local landholders expressed concerns at a community forum related to health effects and the noise of the wind turbines, some of which would be less than a kilometre from homes.

In March 2017, the project was approved by the Coordinator-General. The approved project consisted of up to 115 turbines, with a maximum tip height of 180m, and a maximum rotor diameter of 140m.

The first turbine generated electricity to the grid on 24 June 2019.

In June 2021, it was reported that GE Catcon had successfully demolished a faulty turbine tower on 27 May 2021 after faults were discovered during the commissioning process. Additionally, a further 50 turbines required component replacement after generator issues inside their nacelles were identified.

Project 
For a period of time, Coopers Gap was the largest wind farm in Australia. The wind farm consists of 123 turbines extending across a series of ridge lines within the site. The construction costs of the project were initially to be over $1.2 billion, however construction costs reduced from the start of the development process, so the final cost was A$850 million.

The electricity generated from each turbine is transmitted via underground or above ground cabling to a central cable marshalling point at the on site substation, which is located along the 275 kV power line that runs through the site area. The substation then connects directly into the grid network on site. It is expected to reduce greenhouse gas emissions by up to 2.2 million tonnes annually.

Operations 
The wind farm registered its first grid output in June 2019 and was fully commissioned in June 2021. It was planned to be commissioned late in 2020. On 19 June 2021, the wind farm reached an output of 438.2 MW, or 99.59% of its maximum registered output of 440 MW. 

Note: Asterisk indicates power output was limited during the month.

See also

Wind power in Australia

References

Wind farms in Queensland
Wide Bay–Burnett
Darling Downs